Mahish Bathan is a village in Karimpur II CD Block under Tehatta subdivision of Nadia district in the state of West Bengal, India.

Demographics
As per the 2011 Census of India, Mahish Bathan had a total population of 9,831, of which 5, 054 (51%) were males and 4,777 (49%) were females. Population below 6 years was 965. The total number of literates in Mahish Bathan was 5,948 (67.09% of the population over 6 years).

Transport
SH 11, running from Mahammad Bazar (in Birbhum district) to Ranaghat (in Nadia district) passes through Mahish Bathan.

References

Villages in Nadia district